The 2018–19 FIS Cross-Country Continental Cup (COC) was a season of the FIS Cross-Country Continental Cup, a series of second-level cross-country skiing competitions arranged by the International Ski Federation (FIS).

The 2018–19 Continental Cup contained nine different series of geographically restricted competitions; five in Europe, two in North America and one each from Asia and Oceania.

Winners
The overall winners from the 2018–19 season's Continental Cups were rewarded a right to start in the first period in the following 2019–20 World Cup season.

References

 
FIS Cross-Country Continental Cup seasons
2018 in cross-country skiing
2019 in cross-country skiing